The list of ship launches in 1901 includes a chronological list of ships launched in 1901.  In cases where no official launching ceremony was held, the date built or completed may be used instead.


References 

Sources

1901
 Ship launches
Ship launches
Ship launches